Ministry of Public Works and Urban Development is a government ministry of Yemen.

References

External links
 Ministry of Public Works and Urban Development (under construction)

Government ministries of Yemen
Public works ministries